Christopher is an unincorporated community and coal town in Perry County, Kentucky, United States. Their Post Office  has been closed.

A post office was established in 1914 in the community then called Douglas. Douglas was renamed Christopher in 1918 in honor of the local Columbus Mining Co., whose founders are said to have come from Columbus, Ohio.

References

Unincorporated communities in Perry County, Kentucky
Unincorporated communities in Kentucky
Coal towns in Kentucky